Copper Gone  is the fifth solo studio album by American rapper Sage Francis. It was released on Strange Famous Records on June 3, 2014. It is the first official studio album after Sage Francis announced his hiatus, which lasted for four years. It peaked at number 180 on the Billboard 200 chart.

Critical reception

At Metacritic, which assigns a weighted average score out of 100 to reviews from mainstream critics, the album received an average score of 64, based on 7 reviews, indicating "generally favorable reviews".

Bram E. Gieben of The Skinny gave the album 4 stars out of 5, saying, "On the evidence of Copper Gone, Francis is back on top form, spitting the kind of melancholic, philosophical couplets which made him the go-to emcee for literate lyrics laced with dense, allusive layers of meaning."

Track listing

Personnel
Credits adapted from liner notes.

 Sage Francis – vocals
 Cecil Otter – production (1, 5)
 Alxndrbrwn – production (2)
 James Hancock – production (3)
 Poindexter – production (3)
 Reanimator – production (4, 11)
 Le Parasite – production (6)
 Buck 65 – production (7)
 Prolyphic – production (8)
 Anders Parker – production (9)
 Alias – production (10), mixing
 Dub Sonata – production (12)
 John Ash – production (13)
 Kurtis SP – production (14)
 Dilly Dilly – vocals
 Athena Hiotis – piano
 Joshua Trinidad – horns
 Daddy Kev – mastering
 Jelena Bojanic – artwork
 Irena Mihalinec – graphic design
 Sarah "Inkymole" Coleman – illustration
 Prentice Danner – photography
 Davor Drokan – photography

Charts

References

External links
 
 

2014 albums
Sage Francis albums
Strange Famous Records albums
Albums produced by Alias (musician)